The 2nd Battalion (abbreviated as 2BN) is an infantry unit of the Norwegian Army, based at camp Skjold in Troms county in Northern Norway. It serves in the light infantry role specialized in Arctic warfare as part of Brigade Nord; the battalion is one of three manoeuvre battalions within the brigade, along with Telemark Battalion and Panserbataljonen. The 2nd Battalion serves two roles, primarily being organised for domestic defence; however, during Norway's contribution to the NATO forces in Afghanistan, the 2nd Battalion played a vital role. The 2nd Battalion also contributed consistently to the ISAF forces in northern Afghanistan, supporting an elite trained light infantry, organized as a Quick Reaction Force (QRF). The battalion is divided into four companies: Bravo company, Charlie company, the cavalry squadron and the support company. Bravo company and Charlie company serves as specialized light infantry, focusing on Arctic warfare and urban warfare. The cavalry squadron is the battalion's internal intelligence unit as well as consisting of one platoon of marksmen. The support company is the largest of the four, and primarily consists of medics, anti-tank personnel, combat, service and support. The battalion uses a khaki beret, as opposed to the traditional black beret worn by cavalry units throughout the world, which symbolizes the battalion's history.

In November 2007, during Operation Harekate Yolo, soldiers from the 2nd Battalion and the Coastal Ranger Command Kystjegerkommandoen stationed in Mazar-e-Sharif were involved in what has been referred to as some of the heaviest combat operations involving Norwegian Army troops since World War II. After an Afghan National Army (ANA) unit was attacked by Taliban forces in the Ghowrmach district in the province of Baghdis, soldiers from 2nd Battalion and  Kystjegerkommandoen responded. Outnumbered and facing heavy Taliban resistance, machine guns, mortar teams, snipers and CV9030s were used to attack the enemy combatants. Air strikes were eventually called in to drive off the remaining Taliban fighters. While no NATO casualties were reported, the exact Taliban death toll had not yet been disclosed as of 9 November 2007. However, according to Norwegian news reports, "between 45 and 65 insurgents" were killed in action. This was the first known uses of the Swedish-made CV9030 in live combat.

The motto of the battalion is In hoc Signo Vinces (Latin for "In this sign, thou shalt conquer."). Translated in Norwegian to "Under dette tegnet, skal vi seire.", it refers to the griffin seen on the coat of arms.

Organization

References

Norwegian Army page on 2nd Battalion (in Norwegian)
forsvaret.no/om-forsvaret/organisasjon/haren/avdelinger/brigadenord/Sider/2bataljon.aspx

Infantry battalions of Norway
Military units and formations established in 2003